The 2012–13 Eurocup Basketball Knockout stage was the last phase in the competition. Quarterfinals started on March 6 and the Final was played on April 13.

All times are CET (UTC+1).

Bracket

Quarterfinals
The quarterfinals were two-legged ties determined on aggregate score. The first legs were played on March 6 and return legs were played on March 13. The group winner in each tie, listed as "Team #1", hosted the second leg.

Game 1

Game 2

Uxúe Bilbao Basket won 182-163 on aggregate

Valencia BC won 148-141 on aggregate

PBC Lokomotiv-Kuban won 162-119 on aggregate

BC Budivelnyk Kyiv won 145-139 on aggregate

Semifinals
The semifinals were two-legged ties determined on aggregate score. The first legs were played on March 20 and return legs were played on March 26–27. The team finishing in the higher Last 16 place, listed as "Team #1", hosted the second leg.

Game 1

Game 2

Uxúe Bilbao Basket won 168-136 on aggregate

PBC Lokomotiv-Kuban won 160-155 on aggregate

Final
The final took place on April 13, 2013 in Spiroudome, Charleroi, Belgium.

Final game

References

2012–13 Eurocup Basketball